The Women's sprint was held on 22 October 2011 with 23 riders participating.

Medalists

Results

Qualifying
Fastest 24 riders advanced to 1/16 finals, the qualifying was held at 12:05.

1/16 Finals
Winner of each heat qualified to 1/8 Finals, the races were held at 13:16.

1/8 Finals
Winner of each heat qualified to 1/4 Finals, losers went to the repêchage. The races were held at 14:10.

1/8 Finals Repechage
The loser of the 1/8 Finals raced, winners advanced to the Quarterfinals. Races were held at 14:34.

Quarterfinals
The races were held at 15:22, 16:16 and 16:26.

Race for 5th-8th Places
The race was held at 20:45.

Semifinals
The races were held at 19:30 and 20:12.

Finals
The races were held at 21:10 and 21:25.

References

2011 European Track Championships
European Track Championships – Women's sprint